Islam in Malaysia is represented by the Shafi‘i school of Sunni jurisprudence. Islam was introduced to Malaysia by traders arriving from Arabia, China and the Indian subcontinent. It became firmly established in the 15th century. In the Constitution of Malaysia, Islam is granted the status of "religion of the Federation" to symbolize its importance to Malaysian society, while defining Malaysia constitutionally as a secular state. Therefore, other religions can be practiced freely. Close to 7% adhere to smaller branches (Ibadi, Quranist, etc.).

Malaysia is a country whose most professed religion is Islam. As of 2020, there were approximately 20.6 million Muslim adherents, or 63.5% of the population. Various Islamic holidays such as Eid al-Fitr, Eid al-Adha and Mawlid have been declared national holidays alongside Christmas, Chinese New Year, and Deepavali.

Background

The draft Constitution of Malaysia did not specify an official religion. This move was supported by the rulers of the nine Malay states, who felt that it was sufficient that Islam was the official religion of each of their individual states. However, Justice Hakim Abdul Hamid of the Reid Commission which drafted the constitution came out strongly in favour of making Islam the official religion, and as a result the final constitution named Islam as the official religion of Malaysia. All ethnic Malays are Muslim, as defined by Article 160 of the Constitution of Malaysia.

Religion of the Federation
Nine of the Malaysian states, namely Kelantan, Terengganu, Pahang, Kedah, Perak, Perlis, Selangor, Johor, and Negeri Sembilan have constitutional Malay monarchs (most of them styled as Sultans). These Malay rulers still maintain authority over religious affairs in states. The states of Penang, Malacca, Sarawak, and Sabah do not have any sultan, but the king (Yang di-Pertuan Agong) plays the role of head of Islam in each of those states as well as in each of the Federal Territories of Kuala Lumpur, Labuan, and Putrajaya.

On the occasion of Malaysia's first prime minister Tunku Abdul Rahman's 80th birthday, he stated in the edition of 9 February 1983 of the newspaper The Star that the "country has a multi-racial population with various beliefs. Malaysia must continue as a secular State with Islam as the official religion". In the same issue of The Star, Abdul Rahman was supported by the third Malaysian prime minister, Hussein Onn, who stated that the "nation can still be functional as a secular state with Islam as the official religion."One of Malaysia's states, Kelantan, is governed by Pan-Malaysian Islamic Party (PAS), which is a conservative Islamic political party, with a proclaimed goal of establishing an Islamic state. Terengganu was briefly ruled by PAS from 1999 to 2004, but the ruling Barisan Nasional coalition has since won back the state. To counter the falling credibility of United Malays National Organisation's (UMNO) Islamic credentials vis-à-vis PAS, the head of the Barisan Nasional, Datuk Seri Abdullah Badawi, proposed Islam Hadhari. In the 1990s, the PAS-led governments of Terengganu tried to implement strict Islamic Sharia law, but was blocked in parliament as it violated Malaysia's secular Federal constitution. Malaysia's constitution is based on the English common law, a legacy of British colonial rule.

The newest format of the Malaysian identity card (MyKad) divides Malaysians into various religious groups, e.g., Muslim, Christian, Hindu, Buddhist. The introduction of this card caused a political uproar and remains controversial.

There is also an Islamic university in Malaysia called the International Islamic University Malaysia, and a government institution in charge of organising pilgrimages to Mecca called Tabung Haji (Pilgrim Fund Board of Malaysia). In addition, the government also funds the construction of mosques and suraus.

The Department of Islamic Development Malaysia (JAKIM) was established under the Prime Minister's Department. Besides, every state also has its own version of JAKIM. Various Islamic rules and regulations governing the public and family life were codified into law that is compliant to Islam. Government policies have also be permissible in Islam, in other words 'halal'.

The National Fatwa Council was established by Conference of rulers to issue fatwas. It conducts two types of meetings, one was authorised by the Conference of Rulers, another called muzakarah (discourse) is held occasionally without the order of the Conference of Rulers.

History

Individual Arab traders, including Sahabas, preached in the Malay Archipelago, Indo-China, and China in the early seventh century. Islam was introduced to the Malay Peninsula coast by Arabs in 674 CE.

Islam was also brought to Malaysia by 
Arab Muslim and Tamil Indian Muslim traders in the 12th century AD. It is commonly held that Islam first arrived in the Malay peninsula since Sultan Mudzafar Shah I (12th century) of Kedah (Hindu name Phra Ong Mahawangsa), the first ruler to be known to convert to Islam after being introduced to it by Indian traders who themselves were recent converts. In the 13th century, the Terengganu Stone Monument was found at Kuala Berang, Terengganu, where the first Malay state to receive Islam in 1303 Sultan Megat Iskandar Shah, known as Parameswara prior to his conversion, is the first Sultan of Melaka. He converted to Islam after marrying a princess from Pasai, of present-day Indonesia.

The religion was adopted peacefully by the coastal trading ports people of Malaysia and Indonesia, absorbing rather than conquering existing beliefs. By the 15th and 16th centuries it was the majority faith of the Malay people.

Contemporary Islam
Contemporary Islam follows the Shafi‘ite school of Sunnism. Some Islamic terms, such as the word Allah, are forbidden to non-Muslims both orally and in government's ban on the use of the word "Allah" by non-Muslims, reversing the 2009 ruling of a court of first instance.

Until the 1970s, many Malay Muslims lived a liberal and moderate Islam, like Indonesian Muslims. At this time, a wave of Islamisation emerged (sparked by various social and ethnic conflicts, linked to the Al-Arqam parties and Islam Se-Malaysia), so that today, Malaysia lives in a more Islamic environment compared to the earlier years. Malays, who represent 50.4% of the total population, are almost all Muslims. About 70% of Malay Muslims wear headscarves, while their port was marginal until the 1980s. The traditional Malay garment, of Islamic origin, is also worn by many Malays.

Freedom of worship
Article 3 (1) of the Malaysian Constitution provides:

Article 11 of the constitution provides:

Originally authorised for the country's independence in 1957, apostasy became illegal following an amendment to the country's constitution in 1988. The internationally reported attempt by Lina Joy to convert from Islam to Christianity is one of the most famous representations.

While this was not a problem during the colonial era, Muslims wishing to change their religion face severe deterrence. Before 1988, the question of freedom of religion and therefore of questions relating to the desire of citizens to change their religion was exclusively within the jurisdiction of secular courts. But since the law has changed, an amendment stipulates that secular courts no longer have the right to deal with claims by Muslims and that only Islamic Shariah courts have jurisdiction to discuss issues related to human rights. Apostasy is one of them and it follows that it is constitutionally legally impossible for a Muslim to change his belief.Many Muslims who have changed their religion, whether it is conversion to Buddhism, Christianity, Sikhism, Taoism and other beliefs, are forced for their own safety to lead a double life. In some cases, denunciations of apostasy have already been reported as being reported to the authorities by family members or co-workers.

In February 2014, Edry Faizal, a coordinator in charge of the Democratic Action Party, claimed that it was inconsistent from a Quranic point of view to forbid Muslims from freely changing beliefs, but from his point of view was the best alternative that the power had found to preserve its Malaysian electorate and consequently to remain in power continuously.

In May 2014, Malaysian Prime Minister Najib Razak said during his speech about the future of the country that: "We will never tolerate any demand for the right to apostasy by Muslims, and we refuse that Muslims can have the right to be tried by courts other than sharia courts, and we will not allow Muslims to participate in LGBT activities". But he concluded that this was necessary because: "This is in line with our efforts to make Malaysia a modern, progressive Muslim country in order to achieve the status of a developed nation with a high income for 2020".

In recent years, more and more voices have been asked to try to determine the number of ethnic Malay people supposed to have left Islam. The government has remained silent on the question, believing that it is much too controversial to be debated. However estimates go from 135, according to Ridhuan Tee, a Muslim preacher, to 260,000, according to Harussani Zakaria, the mufti of the state of Perak. The latter highest estimate when put in the context of the 2010 population census would make them to be between 3 and 4% of the Malaysian majority. Nevertheless, no data estimating the number of Malay who converted to another religion was provided.

Nonetheless, these remarks later triggered a polemic often repeated in the media by Islamist and nationalist circles that recognising the right of the Malayans and the entire Muslim community to be free to choose their own beliefs would risk provoking a "Massive exodus of apostates" within the nation, the same slogan has also been listed on the official website of Islam in Malaysia. On 17 December 2015, Malaysian Police Chief Tan Sri Khalid Abu Bakar during a speech, alluded to this mysterious report: "I can not tell you how much this issue is and potentially explosive. "

Religious discrimination
The state banishes and sanctions non-Muslim proselytism, but encourages conversions to Islam and remunerates them in order to facilitate the reduction of the non-Muslim population within the nation. Among the new rights provided to converts, if they have child/children, they have the right to convert their children by force to Islam, without having to consider the approval of his spouse.

In March 2015, unrest erupted in Miri, Sarawak, when a 13-year-old Dayak schoolgirl complained to the police, along with her parents, after being sequestrated at her school by two of her teachers who wanted to convert her to Islam by forcing her to recite Shahada. The latter then rewarded his conversion by donating 250 ringgit. In order to ease interfaith tensions, the two teachers were subsequently fired and transferred out of the state of Sarawak.

On 4 December 2015, Malaysian feminist and human rights activist, Shafiqah Othman Hamzah said, "What we are living in Malaysia is almost no different from apartheid. While segregation was racial in South Africa, in our country we live in religious segregation."

On 9 February 2016, the Putrajaya Federal Court ruled on a scandal termed the  "S Deepa Affair" dating back to 4 September 2013, involving forced conversions of children to Islam in a Hindu couple married since 2003. In this case, the father N. Viran converted to Islam in November 2012 under the name of Izwan Abdullah decided to impose his conversion to his two children, his son Mithran and his daughter Sharmila. Shortly after that, the children had their names changed to Nabil for the son and Nurul Nabila for the girl. Becoming the only person judged capable of raising them, he had obtained from the Shari'a court of Seremban their sole custody and through this the dissolution of his marriage.

Their marriage, which had been celebrated according to the Hindu rites and subsequently registered in the civil registers, was thus dissolved by the Shari'a court on the sole ground of the conversion to Islam by the husband, making it immediately obsolete. However, the Seremban High Court ruled that the annulment of the marriage was illegal and decided to return the custody of the children to the mother on 7 April 2014.

However, two days later Izwan kidnapped his son during a home visit by his ex-wife. Deepa quickly requested the High Court for police aid in getting her son back. Izwan decided to appeal the decision by the Seremban High Court and sought the help from the Shari'a court to assert his rights. The Court of Appeal rejected both appeals in December 2014. Child custody in February 2016 was finally divided by the Court of Appeal. The guard of the son was entrusted to the father, in this case, Izwan and the guard of the daughter to the mother, S Deepa. Asked by the media at the announcement of the verdict, she announced in tears: "This is injustice, I am upset. It was my last hope that the court would return my two children, but it was not so. Only my daughter was given to me."

Influences of Zheng He's voyages

Zheng He is credited to have settled Chinese Muslim communities in Palembang and along the shores of Java, the Malay Peninsula, and the Philippines. These Muslims allegedly followed the Hanafi school in the Chinese language. This Chinese Muslim community was led by Hajji Yan Ying Yu, who urged his followers to assimilate and take local names.

Denominations

Sunni Islam
The Sunni Islam of the Shafi'i school of thought is the official, legal form in Malaysia, although syncretist Islam with elements of Shamanism is still common in rural areas. Mosques are an ordinary scene throughout the country and azan (call to prayer) from minarets are heard five times a day. Government bodies and banking institutions are closed for two hours every Friday so Muslim workers can conduct Friday prayer in mosques. However, in certain states such as Kelantan, Terengganu, Kedah and Johor, the weekends fall on Friday and Saturday instead of Saturday and Sunday. It has been introduced to several states, notably Kelantan and Terengganu, all businesses close for 2 hours on every Friday for prayers. Failure to comply would result in fines.

Since it is compulsory for Muslims to perform a prayer 5 times a day no matter where they are, almost all public places, including shopping malls, hotels, condominiums, usually have allocated spaces called "Surau", for performing the Muslim prayers.

In 2017, it was reported that Wahhabism is spreading among Malaysia's elite, and that the traditional Islamic theology currently taught in Government schools is gradually being shifted to a view of theology derived from the Middle East, particularly Saudi Arabia.

Shia Islam
The Malaysian government has strict policies against other Islamic sects, including a complete ban on Shia Islam, allegedly to "avoid violence between the two faiths that has sometimes broken out in other parts of the world by promoting only the Sunni faith". Due to decades of the Saudi funding, Shia Islam is openly and freely demonised and Shia Muslims are oppressed in the country, their prayers and gatherings are broken up, state's secret service also engages in Shia forced disappearances. Anti-Shi'ism reaches such an extent that the mainstream media always present Iran in bad light while blindly glorying Saudi Arabia. For example, in 2019 Malaysian police raided multiple private functions commemorating the martyrdom of Husayn ibn Ali at the battle of Karbala, arresting scores of foreign and local Shia Muslims. While the true numbers are not known, the number of Malaysian Shia Muslims is estimated at around 250,000.

Other sects
A notable sect that has been outlawed is Al-Arqam.

Muslims who believe Mirza Ghulam Ahmad to be the fulfilment of the Islamic prophecies concerning the return of Jesus, the Ahmadiyya, are also present. There are approximately 2,000 Ahmadis in the country. Though small in number, they face state sanctioned persecution in Malaysia.

Muslims who reject the authority of hadith, known as Quranists, Quraniyoon, or Ahl al-Quran, are also present in Malaysia. The most notable Malaysian Quranist is the scholar Kassim Ahmad.

Cultural role

Islam is central to and dominant in Malay culture. A significant number of words in the Malay vocabulary can trace their origins to Arabic which is the common language of Islamic prayer and rituals. This is, however, not exclusive and words from other cultures such as Portuguese, Chinese, Dutch, Sanskrit, Tamil, English, and French can also be found in the Malay language. Islam is so ingrained in Malay life that Islamic rituals are practised as Malay culture. Muslim and Malays are interchangeable in many daily contexts.

Hari Raya Aidilfitri (Eid ul-Fitr) is an important festival celebrated by Malaysian Muslims.

Muslim women generally wear the tudung (hijab or headscarf) over their heads. However, Malay women not wearing any headgear are not reprimanded or penalised. Prominent Malaysian female examples are Rafidah Aziz, International Trade and Industry Minister and Siti Hasmah Mohamad Ali, wife of then Malaysian Prime Minister Mahathir bin Mohamad. However, with the influx of Arabic travellers, foreign Muslim women (Arabs) wearing hijab that leave only their eyes exposed are often spotted in tourist attractions, not the least at the shopping malls. At certain Malaysian institutions such as the International Islamic University, wearing of the tudung is mandatory; however, for non-Muslim students this usually amounts to a loosely worn piece of cloth draped over the back of the head.

Some regard the tudung to be an indication of Arabic influence in Malay Muslim culture, and point to incidents such as the banning of the traditional Malay wayang kulit in the state of Kelantan (which was ruled by the Islamist PAS) to be "un-Islamic".

Malaysia's top Islamic body, the National Fatwa Council, ruled against Muslims practising yoga, saying it had elements of other religions that could corrupt Muslims.
The same body has ruled against ghosts and other supernatural beings.

Political issues

Definition of Malay
As defined by the Constitution of Malaysia, Malays must be Muslim, regardless of their ethnic heritage; otherwise, legally, they are not Malay. Consequently, apostate Malays would have to forfeit all their constitutional privileges, including their Bumiputra status, which entitles them to affirmative action in university admissions and discounts on purchases of vehicles or real estate. It is legally possible to become a Malay if a non-Malay citizen with a Malaysian parent converts to Islam and thus claims all the Bumiputra privileges granted by Article 153 of the Constitution and the New Economic Policy (NEP). However, the convert must "habitually speak the Malay language" and adhere to Malay culture. A tertiary textbook for Malaysian studies following the government-approved syllabus states: "This explains the fact that when a non-Malay embraces Islam, he is said to masuk Melayu ("become a Malay"). That person is automatically assumed to be fluent in the Malay language and to be living like a Malay as a result of his close association with the Malays".

Islam in Malaysia is thus closely associated with the Malay people, something an Islamic scholar has criticised, saying that Malaysian Islam is "still clothed in communal garb; that Muslims in Malaysia have yet to understand what the universal spirit of Islam means in reality".

Sharia legal system
Parallel to the civil courts, there are Sharia courts which conduct legal matters related to Muslim family sphere. Legal issues like Muslim divorce and Muslim apostasy are conducted in the Syariah Courts. However, there are cases whereby apostasy cases are tried in the Federal Courts. Non-Muslims are not bound by Sharia.

Accusations of "Christian agendas"

In mid-2017, Kamarul Zaman Yusoff who is a former senior lecturer at Universiti Utara Malaysia alleged that it was the Christian members of the largely Chinese-based Democratic Action Party (DAP) that held effective power over the party and that it had a "Christian agenda". He claimed that numerous party officials including party Secretary-General Lim Guan Eng of being a Christian. DAP parliamentary leader Lim Kit Siang refuted the allegations and accused the United Malays National Organisation (UMNO) of spreading lies about the DAP.

On 12 July 2018, UMNO Supreme Council member Datuk Lokman Noor Adam claimed that the DAP which is a component party of the then governing Pakatan Harapan coalition was attempting to make Christianity the official religion of Malaysia.

Clothing

As of 2013, most Muslim Malaysian women wear the tudung, a type of hijab. This use of the tudung was uncommon prior to the 1979 Iranian Revolution, and the places that had women in tudung tended to be rural areas. The usage of the tudung sharply increased after the 1970s, as religious conservatism among Malay people in both Malaysia and Singapore increased.

Several members of the Kelantan ulama in the 1960s believed the hijab was not mandatory. However, in 2015 the majority of Malaysian ulama believed this previous viewpoint was un-Islamic. The National Fatwa Council has issued a ruling against young Muslim women wearing trousers.

Norhayati Kaprawi directed a 2011 documentary about the use of tudung in Malaysia, Siapa Aku? ("Who am I?").

Despite the hijab, or tudung being non-mandatory in Malaysia, some government buildings enforce within their premises a dresscode which bans women, Muslim and non-Muslim, from entering while wearing "revealing clothes".

In 2014, the feminist Muslim organization Sisters in Islam was named in a fatwa by the Selangor Islamic Religious Council. They had previously supported Muslim women who attempted to compete in the Miss Malaysia pageant before four had to withdraw.

Distribution of Muslims
According to the 2020 census, 63.5% of its population (20,623,140 people) were Muslim. All individuals who self-identify as ethnic Malays are categorised as Muslims (see also ethnoreligious group). The data shows the non-Malay who self-identifies as Muslim does not "menjadi Melayu" and still counted separately from Malay ethnic group. Information collected in the census based on respondent's answer and did not refer to any official document.

By ethnic group

By gender and ethnic group

By state/federal territory and ethnic group

Islam-related tourist attractions
 Islamic Arts Museum Malaysia
 Islamic Heritage Museum
 Kelantan Islamic Museum
 Malacca Al-Quran Museum
 Malacca Islamic Museum
 Malay and Islamic World Museum
 Penang Islamic Museum

See also

 Outline of Islam
 Glossary of Islam
 Index of Islam-related articles
 Freedom of religion in Malaysia
 Islam by country
 Religion in Malaysia
 Tabung Haji

References

External links

 IslamGRID project by Department of Islamic Development Malaysia (Jakim) 
 Department of Islamic Development Malaysia (Jakim)
 Jakim.TV: Islamic TV by Department of Islamic Development Malaysia (Jakim)

 
Religion in Malaysia
Malaysia